Santiago Tlazoyaltepec is a town and municipality in Oaxaca in south-western Mexico. The municipality covers an area of 93.13 km². 
It is part of the Etla District in the Valles Centrales region.
As of 2005, the municipality had a total population of 4,357.

References

Municipalities of Oaxaca